Mariel Buckley is a Canadian country music singer-songwriter based in Calgary, Alberta. She is the younger sister of singer T. Buckley.

Biography
Buckley was born in Calgary, Alberta.

Buckley recorded an EP in 2012, and her first album, Motorhome, in 2014. The album was produced by Derek Pulliam, and featured mainly acoustic music. Buckley was accompanied by a string trio with Charlie Hase on pedal steel, Scott Duncan on fiddle, and Pulliam on bass. Buckley was a finalist in the 2014 All-Alberta Songwriting Contest.

In 2018, she recorded a second album, the alt-country Driving in the Dark.  The album was produced by Leeroy Stagger. In August that year the album rose to #2 on the !earshot National Folk/Roots/Blues Chart. Also in 2018 Buckley performed at the Vancouver Folk Music Festival.

Her latest album, Everywhere I Used to Be, is slated for release in August 2022.

In December 2022, Buckley and her brother released a cover The Tragically Hip's "Bobcaygeon" as a single.

References

Canadian women country singers
Living people
Musicians from Calgary
Canadian country singer-songwriters
Canadian women singer-songwriters
21st-century Canadian women singers
Year of birth missing (living people)
Canadian LGBT singers
21st-century Canadian LGBT people